Hana Veselá is a former competitive figure skater who represented Czechoslovakia. She is the 1983 Winter Universiade bronze medalist and a three-time Czechoslovak national champion (1982–84). She placed 10th at the 1981 Prize of Moscow News, 12th at the 1982 European Championships in Lyon, France, and 16th at the 1983 European Championships in Dortmund, West Germany.

Competitive highlights

References 

Czechoslovak female single skaters
Universiade medalists in figure skating
Living people
Year of birth missing (living people)
Universiade bronze medalists for Czechoslovakia
Competitors at the 1983 Winter Universiade